Hypoperigea tonsa is a moth species of the family Noctuidae. It is found in all of mainland Australia and Norfolk Island.

External links
Australian Faunal Directory

Moths of Australia
Moths described in 1852
Hadeninae